Lander Panera Arteagabeitia (born 4 December 1981) is a Spanish professional footballer who plays for Yau Tsim Mong in the Hong Kong First Division League as a defensive midfielder.

Club career

Career in Spain
Arteagabeitia started his professional career at the fifth-tier Divisiones Regionales de Fútbol in Spain. He played for four clubs at the fifth-tier division league for eight seasons before joining fourth-tier, Tercera División club Alicante CF in 2011.

Southern
Arteagabeitia joined newly promoted Hong Kong First Division League club Southern District RSA in mid-2012, along with other three Spanish players. He made his debut for the club on 1 September 2012 against Biu Chun Rangers. He suffered a tibial plateau fracture on 19 January 2013 against Sun Pegasus, for which he hand surgery later that day. Arteagabeitia was expected to stay on the sidelines for three months and would miss the rest of the season.

Club statistics (Hong Kong)
 As of 5 May 2013.

References

External links
 
 Futbolme Profile  
 AllSportsPeople Profile
 Lander Panera Arteagabeitia at HKFA

1981 births
Living people
Footballers from Alicante
Spanish footballers
Association football midfielders
Tercera División players
Alicante CF footballers
Hong Kong First Division League players
Spanish expatriate footballers
Expatriate footballers in Hong Kong
Southern District FC players
Spanish expatriate sportspeople in Hong Kong